Nenoue-ko Dam is an earthfill dam located in Gifu Prefecture in Japan. The dam is used for irrigation. The catchment area of the dam is 0.2 km2. The dam impounds about   ha of land when full and can store 332 thousand cubic meters of water. The construction of the dam was started on 1957 and completed in 1964.

References

Dams in Gifu Prefecture